Cheboi is a surname of Kenyan origin. Notable people with the surname include:

 Collins Cheboi (born 1987), Kenyan middle-distance runner
 Ezekiel Kemboi Cheboi (born 1982), Kenyan steeplechase runner

See also
 Cheboin

Kenyan names
Swahili-language surnames